Richard Feld (also Atfeld; died 1401) was a Canon of Windsor from 1390 to 1401.

Career

He was appointed:
King's Almoner
Rector of St Michael, Cornhill 1371 - 1393
Rector of Bishop's Clyve, Worcester

He was appointed to the eleventh stall in St George's Chapel, Windsor Castle in 1390 and held the canonry until 1401.

Notes 

1401 deaths
Canons of Windsor
Year of birth unknown